Scopula ochrea is a moth of the family Geometridae. It is found in Yemen and Oman.

References

Moths described in 2006
Moths of Asia
ochrea